Orangeville is an unincorporated community in Concord Township, DeKalb County, Indiana.

History
Orangeville was platted in 1836.

Geography

References

Unincorporated communities in DeKalb County, Indiana
Unincorporated communities in Indiana